Chowking is a Filipino chain of fast food restaurants that specializes in Filipino Chinese cuisine.

History
Robert Kuan established Chowking in 1985 after working several years managing his family's Ling Nam Wanton Parlor, a Chinese noodle shop based in Santa Cruz, Manila specializing in noodles, congee, siopao, siomai and other dimsum offerings. Kuan conceptualized Chowking as a fast food restaurant with similar offerings as Ling Nam. Kuan opened the first Chowking store on March 18, 1985 in the Rotary Foundation Building (now demolished and part of SM Makati), Makati Commercial Center, Makati.

In 1989, Chowking started expanding its market share amid the volatility of the domestic market. It opened its franchising operations and made its entry into the provincial markets the same year. 

On January 1, 2000, Chowking became a wholly owned subsidiary of Jollibee Foods Corporation.  commenced store renovations to create a new corporate look for Chowking that would result in a comprehensive change for each store.

In 2008, Chowking announced the completion of a Php270-million (US$5.65-million) modernization program, which will help set the stage for the company's future growth. Called “Project DMSSM” (pronounced “dimsum”) for “Designed, Modernized and Streamlined Supply Chain and Manufacturing,” the two-year modernization program that started in 2006 involves the expansion and renovation of Chowking's Noodle Building, increased automation, and the improved integration of food manufacturing processes in its two commissaries in Muntinlupa.

Foreign expansion
To ensure its continued growth, Chowking explored markets outside the Philippines. 

In 1995, the Chowking Food Corporation opened its first US store.

In 1998, Chowking entered the Indonesian market, establishing two key stores in the capital city of Jakarta. These stores were used to study the feasibility of the market and to gauge consumer interest in the company's signature dishes, which include dishes such as fried chicken, noodles, and rice bowls. While the company's expansion into Indonesia was initially focused on Jakarta, Chowking also began to explore other potential locations and key cities as part of its long-term expansion plans. In the years that followed, the company opened additional stores in various parts of Indonesia, building a strong presence in the country's fast food market.

In 2004, the Chowking Food Corporation open its first two stores in Dubai, United Arab Emirates.

In 2008, Chowking had over 400 stores within the Philippines, Indonesia, United States and the Middle East. Chowking has steadily been expanding its network in and around the Philippines. It is able to ensure the freshness of its food and the reliability of its supply through its main commissaries in Highland, Muntinlupa and Sucat, Parañaque, as well as satellite commissaries in Pangasinan, Pampanga, Bulacan, Negros, Iloilo, Cebu, Cagayan de Oro and Davao. In Dubai, United Arab Emirates, Chowking's commissary serves ten stores and is expanding to other areas.

In 2011, Jollibee acquired control over the franchised operations of Chowking USA, later on giving the full ownership to JFC. They also gave 25% ownership to JFC Ayco Inc.

, Chowking operates in key international cities in the US, Indonesia (2), United Arab Emirates (17), Qatar (2) and Oman (1).

In Indonesia, as part of Chowking's ethos of adaptation with local tastes and cultures, the company is one of the first restaurants to be Halal-certified,  courtesy of the Indonesian Ulema Council (MUI). The number of customers grew as a result of the certification and a strong Indonesian-Muslim customer profile was captured in their stores.

Sponsored events
Chowking is also active in the organization of Filipino events in Jakarta.

The brand was a partner in the "Manny Pacquiao vs. Juan Manuel Marquez 3" boxing fundraiser event, together with San Miguel Indonesia, the Four Asian Tigers and the Philippine Embassy in Indonesia. The proceeds were donated to the Jollibee Foundation in 2011 for the benefit of Filipino typhoon victims.

Chowking also partnered with the London School of Public Relations-Jakarta for the latter's first Quadmedia Competition, where students pitched their advertising concepts to a panel of judges consisting of industry professionals.

References

External links
Chowking
Chowking USA
Restaurant USA

Jollibee Foods Corporation brands
Fast-food franchises
Fast-food chains of the Philippines
Regional restaurant chains in the United States
Restaurants established in 1985
Philippine brands
1985 establishments in the Philippines
Chinese restaurants outside China
2011 mergers and acquisitions
Jollibee Foods Corporation subsidiaries